Wenaha National Forest was established as the Wenaha Forest Reserve by the U.S. Forest Service in Oregon and Washington on May 12, 1905 with . It became a National Forest on March 4, 1907. On November 5, 1920 the entire forest was transferred to Umatilla National Forest and the name was discontinued.

References

External links
Forest History Society
Forest History Society:Listing of the National Forests of the United States Text from Davis, Richard C., ed. Encyclopedia of American Forest and Conservation History. New York: Macmillan Publishing Company for the Forest History Society, 1983. Vol. II, pp. 743-788.

 

Former National Forests of Washington (state)
Former National Forests of Oregon
1905 establishments in Oregon
1905 establishments in Washington (state)
1920 disestablishments in Oregon
1920 disestablishments in Washington (state)